Esmatullah Muhabat was elected to the Wolesi Jirga, the lower house of Afghanistan's National Assembly in 2005.
He was killed in December 2005.

References

2005 deaths
Members of the House of the People (Afghanistan)
Year of birth missing